Kuźnica Żelichowska is a village in the administrative district of Gmina Krzyż Wielkopolski, within Czarnków-Trzcianka County, Greater Poland Voivodeship, in west-central Poland.

Before 1772 the area was part of Kingdom of Poland, 1772-1945 Prussia and Germany. For more on its history, see Greater Poland.

References

Villages in Czarnków-Trzcianka County